The 2012 Zucchetti Kos Tennis Cup was a professional tennis tournament played on clay courts. It was the ninth edition of the tournament which was part of the Tretorn SERIE+ of the 2012 ATP Challenger Tour. It took place in Cordenons, Italy between 13 and 19 August 2012.

Singles main draw entrants

Seeds

 1 Rankings are as of August 6, 2012.

Other entrants
The following players received wildcards into the singles main draw:
  Riccardo Bonadio
  Lorenzo Giustino
  Evgeny Korolev
  Nicolás Massú

The following players was given a special exempt into the singles main draw:
  Ilija Bozoljac

The following players received entry from the qualifying draw:
  Theodoros Angelinos
  Aliaksandr Bury
  Marco Cecchinato
  Alejandro González

Champions

Singles

 Paolo Lorenzi def.  Daniel Gimeno Traver,  7–6(7–5), 6–3

Doubles

 Lukáš Dlouhý /  Michal Mertiňák def.  Philipp Marx /  Florin Mergea,  5–7, 7–5, [10–7]

External links
Official Website

Zucchetti Kos Tennis Cup
Internazionali di Tennis del Friuli Venezia Giulia
Zucchetti